Franz "Teddy" Kleindin (July 20, 1914, Berlin – October 12, 2007, Berlin) was a German jazz clarinetist and alto saxophonist, composer, arranger, and bandleader.

After studying cello and clarinet at the Hochschule für Musik, Berlin, he began performing and recording in 1934 with dance and jazz bands, including those of Teddy Stauffer (1936–7) and Kurt Hohenberger (1938–9). 

As a studio musician he recorded with Kutte Widmann (1939–41), Willy Berking (1940–43), and Freddie Brocksieper (1942, 1947), among others. 

He also made recordings with his own bands, including a big band.

References

German jazz bandleaders
German jazz saxophonists
Male saxophonists
German jazz clarinetists
1914 births
2007 deaths
Musicians from Berlin
20th-century saxophonists
20th-century German male musicians
German male jazz musicians